The 4th congressional district of North Carolina is located in the central region of the state. The district includes all of Durham County, Orange County, Granville County, and Franklin County, as well as portions of Chatham County, northern Wake County, and southern Vance County.

Until 2023, the district was currently represented by 11-term Congressman David Price, a former political science professor at Duke who was first elected in 1986, ousting one-term Republican incumbent Bill Cobey. Price was reelected in 1988, 1990, and 1992, but he was defeated in his bid for a fifth term in 1994 by Republican Fred Heineman, the Raleigh Police Chief, in a generally bad year for Democrats in North Carolina. Price came back to defeat Heineman in a rematch in 1996, and has been reelected each time since then by large margins, usually with more than 60% of the vote. In 2020, Price received 67% of the votes (332,421 votes) to defeat Republican challenger Robert Thomas, who received 33% (161,298 votes).

Before court mandated redistricting in 2016, according to research by Christopher Ingraham of The Washington Post, the district was the third most gerrymandered Congressional district in North Carolina and seventh most gerrymandered district in the United States. In contrast, its predecessor was the most regularly drawn of the state's 13 districts.

The fourth district is currently represented by Valerie Foushee.

History
From 2003 to 2013 it contained most of the area commonly known as The Triangle. It included all of Durham and Orange counties, part of Wake County and a small section of Chatham County. The 4th district picked up the most Republican areas of Wake County, such as Apex, Cary, and much of North Raleigh in order to help make the neighboring 13th and 2nd districts more Democratic. For instance, Barack Obama defeated John McCain in the Wake County portion of the district in 2008 by 51–48%, a difference of less than 8,000 votes in between the two candidates. In contrast, Obama won Wake County overall by a much greater margin of 56–43%, and Obama swept the 4th district as a whole by 63–36%. The Republican influence in the district's Wake County portion was more than canceled out by the two Democratic strongholds of Orange and Durham counties, where Obama received 72% and 76%, respectively, his two best counties in the entire state. The 4th district had a Cook PVI of D+8, which made it the most Democratic white-majority district in the entire South outside of South Florida and Northern Virginia.

The district became even more heavily Democratic as a result of 2012 redistricting, in which the more Republican areas of western and southern Wake County were removed, along with northern Orange County and most of its share of Durham County. They were replaced by heavily Democratic portions of Alamance, Cumberland, Harnett and Lee counties. Additionally, the district was pushed further into Raleigh. Like its predecessor, the district is one of the few Southern districts with a significant concentration of progressive-minded white voters—similar to areas around Atlanta, Houston, Charlotte, Nashville, Memphis and Austin. The presence of the University of North Carolina-Chapel Hill and Duke University, as well as large African-American populations in Durham and Raleigh help contribute to the liberal nature of the 4th district.

Before court mandated redistricting in 2016, the district was just barely contiguous; the northern and southern portions were connected by a barely-discernible strip of land along the Lee/Harnett line. Court-mandated redistricting in 2019 again reconfigured the district, returning large portions of Durham County and removing large portions of Raleigh and Cary, North Carolina.

On February 23, 2022, the North Carolina Supreme Court approved a new map which changed the 4th district boundaries to include Alamance and Person while removing Franklin and the parts of Chatham, Vance and Wake.

Counties 
Counties in the 2023-2025 district map.
 Alamance County
 Caswell County (part)
 Durham County
 Granville County
 Orange County
 Person County

Recent election results from presidential races

List of members representing the district

Recent House elections

2002

2004

2006

2008

2010

2012

2014

2016

2018

2020

2022

See also 

 North Carolina's congressional districts
 List of United States congressional districts

References

 
 
 Congressional Biographical Directory of the United States 1774–present

04
Research Triangle